MagnaReady is an American clothing technology and e-commerce brand based in Raleigh, North Carolina, that produces adaptive clothing for those with dexterity issues. After her husband, Don Horton, had trouble buttoning his shirts because of Parkinson's disease, Maura Horton made MagnaReady in 2013. MagnaReady is the original magnetic shirt technology, and it is patented.  

MagnaReady was the first adaptive clothing technology to reach mass market, with the technology licensed to products available at many online retailers.

History 
In 2009, Don Horton, a football coach at North Carolina State University, struggled to button his shirt in the locker room due to Parkinson's disease. That day his shirt was buttoned by Russell Wilson, but his wife, Maura Horton, wanted a better solution for her husband. A former children's clothing designer, she decided to sew magnets into her husband's shirts for ease of use. In 2015, a patent was granted on the technology developed.

In early 2013, after a few years of research, design, and sourcing, the MagnaReady technology was used in shirts launched under a brand by the same namesake. The initial small run of shirts was targeted to elderly men with mobility issues.

In 2016, PVH Corp., producer of Van Heusen, Tommy Hilfiger, Calvin Klein, and IZOD, licensed the MagnaReady technology in order to bring the adaptive shirts to a mass-market audience through stores and e-commerce. In September 2016, a co-branded line of VanHeusen MagnaClick shirts were unveiled and marketed to men suffering from Parkinson's disease.

In September 2017, the MagnaReady technology was licensed in a partnership with LF Americas, a division of Li & Fung, to bring the adaptive products to a larger retail audience.

In October 2017, a shirt using MagnaReady technology was featured by New York’s Museum of Modern Art in the Items: Is Fashion Modern? exhibit as the modern version of a male dress shirt. The exhibit is scheduled to run through January 28, 2017.

MagnaClick
MagnaClick is an adaptive clothing brand based on the MagnaReady technology developed by Maura Horton that is distributed and sold via licensing of the patented technology.

History 
The MagnaClick brand was born in 2016 when MagnaReady technology was licensed to PVH Corp. to create a line of Van Heusen MagnaClick dress shirts for men. PVH billed it as "a game-changing product that offers a stylish, high-quality solution for consumers with limited dexterity or those seeking an alternative to buttons." The shirts were to be sold by select retailers in-store and online in the fall of 2016, including Amazon, Belk, J.C. Penney and Kohl’s.

In 2017, MagnaClick expanded through a partnership with LF Americas, a division of Li & Fung Limited. The partnership will initially expand the brand to men's and women's shirting as well as children's school uniforms. The new MagnaClick line will debut with LF Americas retail partners in 2018.

References 

Clothing companies of the United States
Adaptive clothing